List of Malayalam-language authors lists writers in Malayalam who already have Wikipedia pages. References for the information appear on the linked Wikipedia pages. The list is incomplete – please help to expand it by adding Wikipedia page-owning writers who have written extensively in any genre or field, including science and scholarship. Please follow the entry format.

This list follows alphabetical order. See the List of Malayalam-language writers by category for a more comprehensive list.

A. Ayyappan
Akbar Kakkattil
Akkitham
Ambikasuthan Mangad
Anand
Anil Panachooran
Annie Thayyil
Anoop Sasikumar
Arnos Pathiri
Ashitha
Attoor Ravi Varma
Ayyappa Paniker
Balachandran Chullikkadu
Bodheswaran
C. J. Thomas
C. L. Jose
C. N. Ahmad Moulavi
C. N. Sreekantan Nair
C. Radhakrishnan
C. V. Balakrishnan
C. V. Kunjiraman
C. V. Raman Pillai
C. V. Sreeraman
Chandiroor Divakaran
Changampuzha Krishna Pillai
D. Babu Paul
D. Vinayachandran
E. Harikumar
E. V. Krishna Pillai
E. Vasu
Edappally Raghavan Pillai
Edasseri Govindan Nair
G. Sankara Pillai
Geetha Hiranyan
Gireesh Puthenchery
Gracy
I. C. Chacko
Jose Panachippuram
John Paul Puthusery
K. Jayakumar
K. M. George
K. N. Panicker
K. P. Appan
K. V. Thomas
Kadammanitta Ramakrishnan
Kadathanat Madhavi Amma
Kainikkara Kumara Pillai
Kainikkara Padmanabha Pillai
Kakkanadan
Kalamandalam Hyderali
Kamala Surayya
Kesari Balakrishna Pillai
Kilimanur Ramakanthan
Kottarathil Sankunni
Kottayam Pushpanath
Kovilan
Kumaranasan
Kunjunni
Kureepuzha Sreekumar
Kuttipuzha Krishna Pillai
Kutty Kunju Thankachi
Lalithambika Antharjanam
Lajo Jose
Leela Devi
M. Achuthan
M. Govindan
M. Krishnan Nair
M. Leelavathy
M. Mukundan
M. N. Vijayan
M. P. Narayana Pillai
M. P. Veerendrakumar
M. Sukumaran
M. T. Vasudevan Nair
M. V. Devan
M. G. S. Narayanan
Madhupal
Malayattur Ramakrishnan
Mali Madhavan Nair
Manoj Kuroor
Mary John Thottam
Melppathoor Narayana Bhattathiri
Muttathu Varkey
N. N. Kakkad
N. N. Pillai
N. P. Muhammed
N. S. Madhavan
N. V. Krishna Warrior
Narayan
Narayana Guru
Nitya Chaitanya Yati
O. Chandu Menon
O. N. V. Kurup
O. V. Vijayan
Olappamanna
P Kesavadev
P. C. Sanal Kumar
P. F. Mathews
P. K. Balakrishnan
P. K. Gopi
P. K. Narayana Pillai
P. Narendranath
P. Padmarajan
P. R. Shyamala
P. Valsala
Paipra Radhakrishnan
Pala Narayanan Nair
Pallathu Raman
Pamman
Pandalam Kerala Varma
Paremmakkal Thoma Kathanar
Pattathuvila Karunakaran
Perumbadavam Sreedharan
Ponjikkara Rafi
Poonthanam
Premji
Priya A. S.
Prof. N . Krishna Pillai
Punathil Kunjabdulla
Puthezhath Raman Menon
R. Narayana Panickar
Rajalakshmi
Rajesh Chithira
S. Hareesh
S. K. Pottekkatt
S. L. Puram Sadanandan
S. Rajasekharan
S. Ramesan Nair
Sabeena Rafi
Sajil Sreedhar
Santhosh Echikkanam
 Sankar
Sara Joseph
Satchidanandan
Sethu
Shahina EK
Sippy Pallippuram
Socrates K. Valath
Sooranad Kunjan Pillai
Sreekumaran Thampi
Subhash Chandran
Sugathakumari
Sukumar
Sukumar Azhikode
Sumangala
T. D. Ramakrishnan
T. M. Chummar
T. N. Gopinathan Nair
T. V. Kochubava
Thakazhi Sivasankara Pillai
Thikkodian
Thirunalloor Karunakaran
Thomas Joseph
Thoppil Bhasi
Thunchaththu Ramanujan Ezhuthachan
U. K. Kumaran
Ulloor S. Parameswara Iyer
Unnayi Warrier
Unnikrishnan Puthoor
Uroob
V. Balakrishnan
V. C. Sreejan
V. J. James
V. K. N
V. Madhusoodhanan Nair
V. M. Girija
V. P. Sivakumar
V. R. Krishna Iyer
V.T.Bhatathirippad
V. Unnikrishnan Nair
V. V. K. Valath
Vaikom Muhammed Basheer
Vailoppilli Sreedhara Menon
Vallathol Narayana Menon
Vayalar Ramavarma
Veloor Krishnan Kutty
Vennikkulam Gopala Kurup
Vijayakrishnan
Vijayalakshmi
Yusafali Kechery

Lists of writers by language
 
Lists of people from Kerala